Toni Barry (born June 26, 1961) is a British voice actress. She is also known to fans of the television show Press Gang as Spike's American girlfriend Zoe.

Selected filmography
Project A-ko - Asa
Dangaioh - Dira (uncredited)
Gall Force: Earth Chapter - Sandy Newman
Mystery of Mamo - Fujiko Mine
Bye-Bye Liberty Crisis - Fujiko Mine
Legend of the Four Kings - Matsuri Toba (UK English dub only)
Roujin Z - Haruko
Dominion: Tank Police - Leona Osaki
X - Karen Kasumi
Space Channel 5: Part 2 (video game) - Pine
Press Gang - Zoe (series 3, 1991)
Patlabor: The Movie - Noa Izumi
Patlabor 2: The Movie - Noa Izumi
Moomin - Snork Maiden, Little My
Lapitch the Little Shoemaker - Various Voices
Teletubbies - Voice Trumpets, Talking Flowers Announcer, and Counter (American dubbed version)
Labyrinth - Stepmother (uncredited)
Tears Before Bedtime - Debbie
A House in the Hils - Susie
Sweating Bullets - Amanda
Ben Elton: The Man from Auntie - Swimsuit Model, Doreen, Oompah Audience Member
Unnatural Pursuits - 1st Actress
Endgame - Nikke Bergman
Proteus - Linda
The Armando Iannucci Shows - Guest Star
Twipsy

References

External links

1961 births
British film actresses
British television actresses
British video game actresses
British voice actresses
Living people
Place of birth missing (living people)
20th-century British actresses
21st-century British actresses